Jordan competed at the 2012 Summer Paralympics in London, United Kingdom from 29 August to 9 September 2012.

Three members of the Jordanian team, two athletes and a trainer, were arrested after four females in Northern Ireland filed complaints alleging sexual assault by the men. They were released on bail after an embassy official promised they would be returned to face sexual assault charges. The three men, two powerlifters and a trainer were subsequently withdrawn from the team. One, powerlifter Omar Qaradhi, later pleaded guilty to sexual assault, and received a twelve-month suspended sentence.

Athletics

Men’s Field Events

Powerlifting

Men

Women

Table tennis 

Women

See also

 Jordan at the 2012 Summer Olympics

References

Nations at the 2012 Summer Paralympics
2012
Paralympics